Anne Somerset may refer to:

Anne Somerset (historian) (born 1955), English historian and writer
Anne Somerset, Countess of Northumberland (1538–1596), English noblewoman and one of the instigators of the Northern Rebellion against Elizabeth I
Anne Seymour, Duchess of Somerset ( 1497 – 1587), wife of Lord Protector Somerset